Emil Hansson (born 15 June 1998) is a professional footballer who plays as a left winger for Eerste Divisie club Heracles Almelo. Born in Norway, he is a former youth international for both Norway and Sweden.

Hansson is the son of former Swedish footballer Patrik Hansson. The brother of Emil Hansson's grandfather is Tommy Svensson.

Club career

Brann
Hansson, son of a Norwegian mother, and the former Swedish professional footballer Patrik Hansson, began playing football in his hometown Bergen for Brann before moving to the youth academy of Swedish Allsvenskan club Kalmar FF prior the 2013 season, where his father worked as assistant coach. After six months, he returned to Brann.

There, he was promoted to the first team for the 2015 season, where he made his first two senior appearances in April 2015, one in the cup and one in the league. In total he got two league appearances and four in the 2015 Norwegian Football Cup.

Feyenoord
Hansson joined the youth academy of Dutch Eredivisie club Feyenoord in August 2015. He initially played for the U21 team but made his debut in the Eredivisie on 12 March 2017 in a 5–2 home win over AZ, coming on as an 83rd-minute substitute for Steven Berghuis. For the first team he made a total of two appearances during the 2016–17 season, while continuing as a part of the U21 side and reserves; the first team won the Dutch championship at the end of the season, after an 18-year title drought. The following season, Hansson made 11 appearances for the reserves and two total appearances for the first team, in the KNVB Beker and in the league, respectively. Feyenoord finished third in the Eredivisie that season and won the cup; the 100th edition of the tournament.

In July 2018, Hansson moved to the second-tier Eerste Divisie on loan to RKC Waalwijk. With twelve goals from Hansson in 35 league appearances, the club reached ninth place in the league table and qualified for the first round of the promotion and relegation play-offs. By scoring one goal in six appearances, Hansson contributed to helping RKC achieve promotion to the Eredivisie. He returned to Feyenoord after his loan deal expired.

Hannover 96
In August 2019, Hansson moved to German 2. Bundesliga club Hannover 96 on a three-year contract. The Swede made 14 2. Bundesliga appearances as well as one in the Regionalliga Nord for the reserve team before being loaned out to RKC Waalwijk once again for the second half of the season. Hansson made seven league appearances for RKC, in which he scored one goal, before the season was cancelled after the 26th match-day due to the COVID-19 pandemic. At this point, RKC was bottom of the table, but was able to remain in the Eredivisie due to a suspension of relegations.

Fortuna Sittard
At the beginning of June 2020, Hannover 96 announced that Hansson would not return to the team, but would move on a permanent deal to Eredivisie side Fortuna Sittard for the 2020–21 season.

Heracles Almelo
On 29 January 2022, Hansson moved to another Eredivisie club Heracles Almelo on a 2.5-year contract.

International career
Hansson gained four caps for the Sweden national under-17 team, but later decided to play for Norway. As a result, he appeared in 10 matches each for Norway U16s and U17s, nine for the U18s and three for the U19s.

In December 2018, Hansson finally decided on representing Sweden, and on 22 March 2019, he appeared in a friendly against Russia in Marbella, Spain, for the first time for the Sweden national under-21 team.

Career statistics

Club

Honours
Feyenoord
 Eredivisie: 2016–17
 KNVB Cup: 2017–18
 Johan Cruijff Shield: 2017

References

External links 
 

1998 births
Living people
Footballers from Bergen
Swedish footballers
Sweden youth international footballers
Sweden under-21 international footballers
Norwegian footballers
Norway youth international footballers
Norwegian people of Swedish descent
Swedish people of Norwegian descent
Association football midfielders
SK Brann players
Feyenoord players
RKC Waalwijk players
Hannover 96 players
Fortuna Sittard players
Heracles Almelo players
Norwegian First Division players
Eredivisie players
Eerste Divisie players
2. Bundesliga players
Norwegian expatriate footballers
Swedish expatriate footballers
Expatriate footballers in the Netherlands
Norwegian expatriate sportspeople in the Netherlands
Swedish expatriate sportspeople in the Netherlands
Expatriate footballers in Germany
Norwegian expatriate sportspeople in Germany
Swedish expatriate sportspeople in Germany